Ronald Fava (born March 14, 1949) is an American politician who served in the New Jersey General Assembly from the 35th Legislative District from 1976 to 1978. He ran for Passaic County Clerk in 2018, but lost to Danielle Ireland-Imhof.

References

1949 births
Living people
Republican Party members of the New Jersey General Assembly
Politicians from Paterson, New Jersey